Smicrips palmicola is a species of palmetto beetle in the family Smicripidae. It is found in North America.

References

 Price, Michele B. / Arnett, Ross H. Jr., Michael C. Thomas, Paul E. Skelley, and J. H. Frank, eds. (2002). "Family 78. Smicripidae Horn 1879". American Beetles, vol. 2: Polyphaga: Scarabaeoidea through Curculionoidea, 316–318.

Further reading

 Arnett, R.H. Jr., M. C. Thomas, P. E. Skelley and J. H. Frank. (eds.). (2002). American Beetles, Volume II: Polyphaga: Scarabaeoidea through Curculionoidea. CRC Press LLC, Boca Raton, FL.
 Arnett, Ross H. (2000). American Insects: A Handbook of the Insects of America North of Mexico. CRC Press.
 Richard E. White. (1983). Peterson Field Guides: Beetles. Houghton Mifflin Company.

External links

 NCBI Taxonomy Browser, Smicrips palmicola

Cucujoidea